The XL Center (originally known as the Hartford Civic Center) is a multi-purpose arena and convention center located in downtown Hartford, Connecticut. Owned by the City of Hartford, it is managed by the quasi-public Capital Region Development Authority (CRDA) under a lease with the city and operated by Spectra. In December 2007, the center was renamed when the arena's naming rights were sold to XL Group insurance company in a six-year agreement. The arena is ranked the 28th largest among college basketball arenas. It opened in 1975 as the Hartford Civic Center and was originally located adjacent to Civic Center Mall, which was demolished in 2004. It consists of two facilities: the Veterans Memorial Coliseum and the Exhibition Center.

On March 21, 2007, the CRDA selected the Northland/Anschutz Entertainment Group proposal to operate the arena complex; Northland also developed the Hartford 21 residential tower on the adjacent Civic Center Mall site. It was revealed that Northland will assume total responsibility for the building paying for any and all losses, and will keep any profits. In 2012, the CRDA put the contract out to bid with hopes of combining the operations with Rentschler Field. In February 2013, Global Spectrum of Philadelphia was chosen to take over both the XL Center and Rentschler Field with Ovations Food Services taking over all food and beverage operations.

Hartford Civic Center
The Civic Center is the full-time home of the Hartford Wolf Pack AHL hockey team and part-time home of the University of Connecticut (UConn) men's and women's basketball teams and the UConn Huskies men's ice hockey team. Starting in the late 1990s, UConn men's basketball moved most of their important games—including the bulk of their Big East Conference games—to the Coliseum.   During the 2011–2012 season, for instance, they played 11 home games at the Coliseum and only eight at their on-campus facility, Gampel Pavilion. This practice continued when the Huskies joined the American Athletic Conference, successor to the original Big East, in 2013. The UConn men's hockey team uses the XL Center as its primary home as the newest men's member of Hockey East.

It was the home of the New England/Hartford Whalers of the WHA and NHL from 1975 to 1978 and 1980 to 1997, and the Hartford Hellions of the MISL from 1980 to 1981, and the New England Blizzard of the ABL from 1996 to 1998, and hosted occasional Boston Celtics home games from 1975 to 1995. One of the most famous shots Larry Bird ever made, although it did not count, took place at the Hartford Civic Center: the shot from behind the backboard. It was the home of the Connecticut Coyotes and later the New England Sea Wolves of the Arena Football League.

The arena seats 15,635 for ice hockey and 16,294 for basketball, 16,606 for center-stage concerts, 16,282 for end-stage concerts, and 8,239 for -end stage concerts, and contains 46 luxury suites and a 310-seat Coliseum Club, plus  of arena floor space, enabling it to be used for trade shows and conventions in addition to concerts, circuses, ice shows, sporting events and other events. The graduation ceremonies of Central Connecticut State University and other local colleges are also held annually at the XL Center.

Early history and roof collapse

As originally built in 1975, it seated 10,507 for hockey, and served as the home of the then–New England Whalers for three years. In the early morning of January 18, 1978, the Civic Center's roof collapsed. Engineering analyses during litigation following the collapse indicated that compression members were overloaded through undersizing and underestimation of the probable loadings, and that lateral bracing of individual members was insufficient. "The roof did not fail due to the heavy snow that fell on that January night. According to the official City investigation, the roof began progressive failure as soon as it had been installed. Contributing factors included design errors, an underestimation of the weight of the roof, and differences between the design and the actual built structure."

Investigations attributed the design issues to the unprecedented use of and trust in computer analysis. An absence of peer review for the novel structure and design process, and fragmentation of oversight responsibility during construction were also cited as contributing factors. Evidence showed that the roof had started to fail during construction, with bowed compression members. These distortions, and an unpredicted degree of deflection in the structure, were not investigated before the collapse. There were no injuries due to the collapse. The building was heavily renovated and re-opened January 17, 1980.

The Arena hosted the Hartford Whalers from January 11, 1975, to April 13, 1997. Shortly thereafter the team relocated to Raleigh to become the Carolina Hurricanes. In 1994, new owner Peter Karmanos purchased the team and pledged to keep the Whalers in Connecticut until 1998, unless they could not sell over 11,000 season tickets. After failed negotiations to build a new downtown arena for the Whalers with then-governor John G. Rowland, on March 25, 1997, Karmanos announced that the team would leave. The New York Rangers, looking to capitalize on Hartford as a potential market, placed its farm team there to become the Hartford Wolf Pack starting in 1997. After a short stint as the Connecticut Whale, they reverted to the Wolf Pack moniker in 2013.

Current arena and recent renovations
In September 2010, the arena was upgraded with a new center-hung scoreboard with four Sony Jumbotrons and a state-of-the-art sound system.
The Connecticut State Legislature set aside $35 million in funding for improvements to the XL Center that began in early spring 2014 and completed in time for the start of the 2014–15 seasons of the Wolf Pack and UConn men's hockey in October. Improvements included upgrades to the mechanical system, locker rooms and concourse, replacing jumbotrons with a new HD video board, as well as aesthetic improvements such as a new bar area inside the arena and luxury seating in the lower bowl. A portion of the $35 million allocation went towards a study on the arena's long-term viability; either more major renovations or replacing it with a new facility.

Events
The XL Center has held many notable events including:

The ECAC New England Region tournament, a National Collegiate Athletic Association (NCAA) Division I men's college basketball tournament organized by the Eastern College Athletic Conference (ECAC), took place at the Hartford Civic Center on March 3 and 5, 1977. The tournament champion received an automatic bid to the 1977 NCAA Division I men's basketball tournament.
The 1982 Big East Conference and 1988–1990 America East Conference men's basketball tournaments were also here, as well as occasional games of the UConn Huskies men's basketball team.
 Rock group the Grateful Dead performed at the arena 18 times, on 5/28/1977, 5/10/1980, 3/14/1981, 4/17/1982, 4/18/1982, 10/14/1983, 10/15/1983, 10/14/1984, 10/15/1984, 4/3/1986, 4/4/1986, 3/26/1987, 3/27/1987, 4/3/1988, 4/4/1988, 4/5/1988, 3/18/1990, and 3/19/1990. The concerts from May 28, 1977, October 14, 1983, March 18, 1990, and March 19, 1990, were released in entirety on the live albums To Terrapin: Hartford '77, Dick's Picks Volume 6, Spring 1990 (The Other One), and Spring 1990 (album).
The PBR (Professional Bull Riders) made their first-ever visit to the XL Center for a Built Ford Tough Series (now known as the Unleash the Beast Series) event the weekend of October 7–9, 2011.
The arena hosted the Kellogg's Tour of Gymnastics Champions in 2016.
The arena has hosted many professional wrestling events; including 1990 Survivor Series (which saw the debut of popular wrestling legend The Undertaker), WrestleMania XI, 2000 No Way Out, 2004 Vengeance, and 2019 Money in the Bank.

Boston Celtics

International basketball games

International hockey games

UConn Huskies
The XL Center serves as the second home for the University of Connecticut's men's and women's basketball programs. At the start of the 2014–15 season the UConn men's ice hockey program moved to the XL Center as a condition of its joining Hockey East. In September 2018, the UConn Board of Trustees approved a plan to build a new 2,500-seat arena with 500 seat-backs in Storrs with the option to expand to 3,500 seats if necessary. Though Hockey East requires arenas to hold at least 4,000, UConn received a waiver for the project since the expectation is for the Huskies' men's hockey program to continue to play some of its games at the XL Center in Hartford. The target construction date is April 2021 with substantial completion wanted by October 2022. If everything stays on track, the arena would open in December 2022.

UConn Hockey Attendance Records

Exhibition center

The Exhibition Center consists of a  exhibit hall, a  assembly hall that can divide into two meeting rooms, plus seven meeting rooms totaling  and two lobbies totaling . It is used for trade shows, conventions, banquets, meetings and other events.

The surrounding shopping mall was torn down in 2004 and was replaced by street-level retail shops and a 36-story residential tower named Hartford 21 which opened in 2006 and is the tallest residential tower between New York City and Boston.

See also

List of convention centers in the United States
List of NCAA Division I basketball arenas

References

Notes

External links

XL Center

American Hockey League venues
Basketball venues in Connecticut
Boston Celtics venues
Collapsed buildings in the United States
College basketball venues in the United States
Continental Basketball Association venues
Convention centers in Connecticut
Defunct National Hockey League venues
Former National Basketball Association venues
Gymnastics venues in the United States
Hartford Wolf Pack
Indoor soccer venues in the United States
Music venues in Connecticut
Rebuilt buildings and structures in the United States
Civic Center
Sports venues in Hartford County, Connecticut
Sports venues completed in 1975
Tourist attractions in Hartford, Connecticut
UConn Huskies basketball venues
World Hockey Association venues
1975 establishments in Connecticut
New England Blizzard
Hartford Whalers